Coeliopsis is a genus of orchids. The sole species is Coeliopsis hyacinthosma, native to Costa Rica, Panama, Colombia and Ecuador.

References

External links 

Coeliopsidinae genera
Monotypic Epidendroideae genera
Orchids of Central America
Orchids of South America
Coeliopsidinae